Wendy B. Young is a medicinal chemist and pharmaceutical executive currently employed at Genentech.

Education 
Young received her B.S. and M.S. from Wake Forest University, working with Prof. Huw Davies. She was co-author on an early application of Davies' rhodium(II) carbenoid insertion - Cope rearrangement chemistry, leading to the total synthesis of three small tropane natural products. Young received her Ph.D. from Princeton in 1993, working with Edward C. Taylor on heterocycles derived from natural pigments, one of which ultimately became pemetrexed (Alimta), an oncology treatment. In her postdoctoral fellowship with Samuel Danishefsky, Young was among one of a handful of groups in the mid-1990s to synthesize paclitaxel (Taxol), a highly-oxygenated terpenoid natural product used to treat cancer.

Career 
Despite multiple employment offers on the East Coast of the United States, Young chose to remain in the San Francisco Bay Area for her professional career. From 1995 to 2006, Young worked at Celera Genomics, studying inhibitor compounds of human plasma proteins such as kallikrein and Factors VIIa and IXa. She was recruited to Genentech in 2006, and in 2018 was promoted to Senior Vice President of Small Molecule drug discovery. One of her major research successes was development of a chemistry campaign against Bruton's tyrosine kinase, leading to molecules to potentially treat rheumatoid arthritis and B-cell lymphomas. Her team developed fenebrutinib, currently in Phase II trials for several autoimmune disorders.

Awards 

 2018 - William S. Johnson Symposium, Stanford University
 2017 - Elected Chair of ACS Medicinal Chemistry Division
 2015 - "Most Influential Woman of 2015" - San Francisco Business Times
 1995 - American Cancer Society Postdoctoral Fellowship
 1993 - H.W. Dodds Top Thesis Award, Princeton University

References 

American women biochemists
Princeton University alumni
Medicinal chemistry
Living people
Year of birth missing (living people)
Wake Forest University alumni
21st-century American women